Oleg Voskoboynikov (born 4 July 1971) is a Kazakh former football player who played for the Kazakhstan national football team as a goalkeeper.

Voskoboynikov has made 24 appearances for the Kazakhstan national football team.

Career statistics

International

Honours
 Kazakhstani Footballer of the Year (3):
 1996, 1997, 1998

References

External links

1971 births
Living people
Soviet footballers
Kazakhstani footballers
Kazakhstan international footballers
Association football goalkeepers
Kazakhstan Premier League players
FC Aktobe players
FC Atyrau players
FC Taraz players
FC Ordabasy players
FC Zhenis Astana players
Sportspeople from Almaty
Footballers at the 1998 Asian Games
Asian Games competitors for Kazakhstan